Deepak Sharma may refer to:

 Deepak Sharma (cricketer, born 1960), Indian cricketer
 Deepak Sharma (cricketer, born 1984), Indian cricketer
 Deepak Sharma (director) (born 1975), Indian television director
 Deepak Sharma (writer) (born 1946), Indian writer